The Tollef Jensen House is a historic house located in Galesville, Wisconsin. The house was built in 1913; it utilized clapboard walls in a Queen Anne architecture. It was added to the National Register of Historic Places on September 18, 1984.

It is a two-and-a-half-story assymmetrical "rambling" Queen Anne-style house.  Its state historical society evaluation states: "The house's massiveness and siting make it stand out as a landmark in the area, and combined with its high integrity and state of preservation, it is the best example of the late Queen Anne style in Galesville."

References

1913 establishments in Wisconsin
Houses completed in 1913
Houses in Trempealeau County, Wisconsin
Houses on the National Register of Historic Places in Wisconsin
Queen Anne architecture in Wisconsin
National Register of Historic Places in Trempealeau County, Wisconsin